Kortney Paul Duncan Hause (born 16 July 1995) is an English professional footballer of Bermudian descent, who plays as a defender for Championship club Watford, on loan from  club Aston Villa. He was a regular for both England U20 and England U21 sides and played in Gareth Southgate's victorious 2016 Toulon Tournament side.

Club career

Early career
Hause was released by West Ham at sixteen having joined the club's academy at a young age from his local side Lakeview F.C. He had been a regular for West Ham's under-16s, including taking part in a tour of Bermuda in 2010. He went on to sign for Birmingham City as a scholar following his release, joining alongside fellow West Ham youngster Charlee Adams in late 2011.

Wycombe Wanderers

Having spent only a few months at Birmingham, Hause signed youth team forms with Wycombe Wanderers in February 2012. He signed his first professional contract for Wycombe only a few months after signing youth forms in July 2012. He went on to make his professional debut on 3 November 2012, coming on as a substitute in a 4–1 defeat to Crewe Alexandra in the FA Cup. During the 2013–14 season he became a regular player for Wycombe until suffering an ankle fracture in November 2013.

Wolverhampton Wanderers
On 31 January 2014 he signed for Wolverhampton Wanderers in a -year deal for an undisclosed fee.

In July 2014 Wolves agreed to loan Hause to League One club Gillingham until January 2015. He scored his first goal for Gillingham in a 2–2 draw with Swindon Town on 19 August 2014. However, his loan was cut short in November 2014 when he was recalled by Wolves after having made 17 appearances in total for the Gills. He made his Wolves debut on 13 December 2014 in a 1–0 win at Sheffield Wednesday.

After the departure of Richard Stearman to Fulham, Hause became a main part in the Wolves defence. On 24 October 2015, in a 1–3 loss to Middlesbrough, he suffered a torn hamstring that ruled him out for at least 6 weeks. He scored his first goal for Wolves against Fulham on 10 December 2016.

Having signed a three-year deal in April 2018, Hause was contracted to Wolves until the summer of 2021. On 7 January 2019, Hause signed for Aston Villa on loan until the end of the season with an option of a permanent transfer. Hause made his Aston Villa debut on 12 January 2019, in a 3–0 away defeat by Wigan Athletic. He scored his first Villa goal on 13 March 2019, in a 3–1 away victory over Nottingham Forest.

Aston Villa 
On 17 June 2019, after gaining promotion to the Premier League, Aston Villa announced that they had taken up the option to permanently transfer Hause. The transfer fee was reported as £3m.

On 25 September 2021, Hause scored the only goal at the 88th minute in a match against Manchester United, helping his team win 1–0.

On 22 August 2022, Hause joined Watford on a season-long loan.

International career
Hause was a regular England U20 and England U21 international and played in Gareth Southgate's victorious 2016 Toulon Tournament side, including starting in the final against France in a 2–1 victory.

Early and personal life
Hause attended Grove Primary School and Oaks Park Secondary School,Ilford. Hause is a rapper in his time away from football, using the alias Korts.

Career statistics

Honours
Aston Villa
EFL Championship play-offs: 2019

England U21
Toulon Tournament: 2016

References

External links

Profile at the Football Association website

1995 births
Living people
Footballers from the London Borough of Redbridge
English footballers
England youth international footballers
England under-21 international footballers
Association football defenders
Wycombe Wanderers F.C. players
Wolverhampton Wanderers F.C. players
Gillingham F.C. players
Aston Villa F.C. players
Watford F.C. players
English Football League players
Premier League players
Black British sportspeople